Alexandre Dostie is a Canadian film director whose debut short film, Mutants, was released in 2016. The film won the Toronto International Film Festival award for Best Canadian Short Film at the 2016 Toronto International Film Festival, the Canadian Screen Award for Best Live Action Short Drama at the 5th Canadian Screen Awards, and the Prix Iris for Best Live Short at the 19th Quebec Cinema Awards.

Originally from the Beauce region of Quebec, Dostie is currently based in Trois-Rivières.

His most recent short film, I'll End Up in Jail (Je finirai en prison), premiered in 2019 and received a Prix Iris nomination for Best Live Action Short Film at the 22nd Quebec Cinema Awards.

References

External links

Canadian screenwriters in French
Film directors from Quebec
Writers from Quebec
People from Beauce, Quebec
People from Trois-Rivières
Directors of Genie and Canadian Screen Award winners for Best Live Action Short Drama
French Quebecers
Living people
21st-century Canadian screenwriters
21st-century Canadian male writers
Year of birth missing (living people)